is a Japanese volleyball player who played for Denso Airybees. She plays as number 16 when she plays for the All-Japan women's volleyball team.

Life
Ishii played for the All-Japan team for the first time at the 2012 Asian Women's Cup Volleyball Championship in September 2012.

Clubs
  Hachiōji Jissen Junior High
  Hachiōji Jissen Highschool
  Denso Airybees (2009-2018)

Awards

Clubs
2010 - Empress's Cup -  Champion, with Denso airybees

National Team

 2017 Asian Women's Volleyball Championship -  Champion

References

External links
 V.League - Profile

Japanese women's volleyball players
Living people
1990 births
People from Yamanashi Prefecture